Thorsten Hens (born December 19, 1961) is a German economist and finance academic. According to the Handelsblatt ranking, Hens is among the top 10 economics professors in the German-speaking area (Germany, Switzerland and Austria).

Biography
Hens is Swiss Finance Institute Professor of Financial Economics and director of the Swiss Banking Institute at the University of Zürich, Switzerland as well as a Fellow of Centre for Economic Policy Research and an Adjunct Professor of Finance at the Norwegian School of Economics and Business Administration in Bergen.

His research areas are—among others—evolutionary and behavioral finance.  In researching how investors make their decisions, Professor Hens draws on work in Psychology and applies insights from Biology in order to understand the dynamics of financial markets. He was one of the pioneers of evolutionary finance and cultural finance, where he conducted the first large-scale international test on risk- and time attitudes (INTRA).

His consulting experience includes application of Behavioral finance for Private Banking and evolutionary finance for asset management.

He studied at the University of Bonn and at DELTA in Paris, and previously held professorships at Stanford University and at the University of Bielefeld.

Books
 Financial Economics: A concise Introduction to Classical and Behavioural Finance by Thorsten Hens and Marc O Rieger, Springer Verlag, Heidelberg, Deutschland (2010)
 Handbook of Financial Markets: Dynamics and Evolution by Thorsten Hens and Klaus Reiner Schenk-Hoppé, North Holland (2009), 
 Grundzüge der analytischen Mikroökonomie by Thorsten Hens and Paolo Pamini, Springer Verlag, Heidelberg, Deutschland (2008), 
 Behavioral Finance for Private Banking by Thorsten Hens and Kremena Bachmann, Wiley Finance (2008), 
 Grundzüge der analytischen Makroökonomie by Thorsten Hens and Carlo Strub, Springer Verlag, Heidelberg, Deutschland (2004), 
 General Equilibrium Foundations of Finance by Thorstens Hens and Beate Pilgrim, Kluwer Academic Publishers, Dordrecht, the Netherlands (2003)

Other selected publications
 Evstigneev, I. V., Hens, T. and Schenk-Hoppé, K. R. (2002), MARKET SELECTION OF FINANCIAL TRADING STRATEGIES: GLOBAL STABILITY. Mathematical Finance, 12: 329–339.
 Rieger, M. Wang, M. and Hens, T.: Risk Preferences Around the World, Management Science 2015, 61:3 , 637-648

External links
Homepage of Thorsten Hens
Homepage of the University of Zurich
Homepage of Behavioural Finance Solutions

German economists
Living people
1961 births
Financial economists